Abdülhamid II Mosque is a mosque in Djibouti City, Djibouti. It is the largest mosque in Djibouti.

History 
The idea for the mosque was discussed in 2015, in a meeting of President of Djibouti, Ismail Omar Guelleh and Turkish President Erdogan. Completed in 2019, it was funded by the Turkish Diyanet foundation. It was named after Ottoman Sultan Abdulhamid II. The building, constructed in the Ottoman style, has a capacity of 6,000.

Architecture 
The mosque was constructed on reclaimed land. The mosque was inaugurated in 2019. The inauguration was attended by Prime Minister Abdoulkader Kamil Mohamed. The mosque is built in an Ottoman revival style. It has two minarets with each has a height of 46 meters and a central dome with a height of 27 meters.

References 

2019 establishments in Djibouti
Mosques in Djibouti
Mosques completed in 2019